Trey McIntyre (born November 12, 1969) is an American dancer and choreographer, who has a body of work that includes around 100 original dance pieces. He founded and acts as president of Trey McIntyre Project, a dance company that was based in Boise, Idaho, where he lived in the historic Northend.

Career 

McIntyre was born in Wichita, Kansas, and trained at North Carolina School of the Arts and Houston Ballet Academy. In 1989, he was appointed Choreographic Apprentice to Houston Ballet, a position created especially for him, and in 1995 he became the company’s Choreographic Associate. He has worked for 27 years as a freelance choreographer, producing over 100 pieces during the span of his career so far.

In 2005, McIntyre founded his dance company, Trey McIntyre Project (TMP), which first appeared at the Vail International Dance Festival. The company was initially a summer touring company, but its national and international success led McIntyre to establish the company year-round as of 2008, based in Boise, Idaho. TMP has been featured in The New York Times, Dance Magazine, and on PBS NewsHour, and has earned coast-to-coast acclaim from the likes of the Los Angeles Times, Chicago Tribune, The Boston Globe, People Magazine, and elsewhere. In 2013, Trey McIntyre Project expanded its artistic vision and announced a crowdsourced documentary film entitled Ma Maison. The project was announced on Kickstarter on August 7, 2013, and in November 2013, McIntyre went to New Orleans to begin filming.

On January 16, 2014, it was announced that McIntyre would move the Trey McIntyre Project towards new artistic ventures, reducing his efforts in dance. The company revealed a press release explaining that McIntyre, after contributing heavily to the dance world, is interested in exploring other art forms, specifically film and the visual arts. He will continue to create pieces on a freelance basis but the dance aspect of Trey McIntyre Project is downsizing as he makes room for other artistic projects.

McIntyre is the recipient of numerous awards, including a Choo San Goh Award for Choreography, an Achievement Award from North Carolina School of the Arts, and a Lifetime Achievement Award from the National Society of Arts and Letters, as well as two grants for choreography from the National Endowment for the Arts. His works have been performed by companies including Stuttgart Ballet, American Ballet Theatre, Queensland Ballet, Hubbard Street Dance Chicago, New York City Ballet, The Washington Ballet, Smuin Ballet, Oregon Ballet Theatre, and San Francisco Ballet.

Selected choreography works 
"Be Here Now" (2017)
"Presentce" (2017)
"Big Ones" (2016)
"Under Fire" (2015)
"The Accidental" (2014)
"The Vinegar Works: For Dances of Moral Instruction" (2014)
"Mercury Half-Life" (2013)
"Pass, Away" (2013)
"Robust American Love" (2013)
"The Unkindness of Ravens" (2012)
"Ladies and Gentle Men" (2012)
"Bad Winter" (2012)
"Ways of Seeing" (2012)
"The Sweeter End" (2011)
"Gravity Heroes" (2011)
"Arrantza" (2010)
"Oh, Inverted World" (2010)
"Amado Mio" (2010)
"Ten Pin Episodes" (2010)
"This Awareness Moves Me Forward" (2010)
"(serious)" (2009)
"The Sun Road" (2009)
"Shape" (2009)
"The More I See You" (2009)
"Grass" (2009)
"Ma Maison" (2008)
"Leatherwing Bat" (2008)
"Surrender" (2008)
"Violent Femmes" (2008)
"Old Aunt Boyd" (2008)
"Wild Sweet Love" (2007)
"Queen of the Goths" (2007)
"In Dreams" (2007)
"A Day in the Life" (2007)
"The Blue Boy" (2007)
"Pork Songs" (2007)
"Pluck" (2007)
"Hymn" (2007)
"Go Out" (2006)
"Just" (2006)
"The Barramundi" (2006)
"Sacred Ellington" (2006)
"A Midsummer Night's Dream" (2005)
"Cherish" (2005)
"Rite of Spring (The Engagement)" (2005)
"I Am a Man" (2005)
"Pretty Good Year" (2004)
"Chasing Squirrel" (2004)
"loveCRAZY" (2004)
"The Naughty Boy!" (2004)
"The Illuminations" (2004)
"Sha-Sha" (2004)
"Memory of a Free Festival" (2004)
"The Illuminations" (2004)
"The Reassuring Effects (of Form and Poetry)" (2003)
"Grace" (2003)
"Full Grown Man" (2003)
"The Shadow" (2003)
"Peter Pan" (2002)
"Natural Flirt" (2002)
"High Lonesome" (2001)
"Spirits" (2001)
"Plush" (2001)
"Bound" (2000)
"The Difference Between Naked and Nude" (2000)
"Split" (2000)
"Blue Until June" (2000)
"Aliss in Wonderland" (1999)
"Dance, 5 Steps" (1999)
"Cantilena" (1999)
"Happy Ending" (1999)
"Memphis" (1999)
"Speak" (1998)
"White Noise" (1998)
"Like a Samba" (1997)
"Second Before the Ground" (1996)
"Touched" (1994)
"Steel and Rain" (1994)
"Curupira" (1994)
"MANTIS" (1993)
"Skeleton Clock" (1990)

References

External links 
 Trey McIntyre Project
 Archival footage of Trey McIntyre Project performing McIntyre's work "Wild Sweet Love" at Jacobs Pillow in 2010
 Archival footage of Trey McIntyre Project performing McIntyre's work "Ladies and Gentleman" at Jacob's Pillow in 2012
 "Making (serious)". Interview with Trey McIntyre and clips from the making of "(serious)".

1969 births
American choreographers
Living people
Artists from Wichita, Kansas
Ballet choreographers
LGBT choreographers